Anna Larroucau Laborde de Lucero (March 7, 1864 – September 3, 1956) was a French-Argentine philanthropist and educator. Pioneer of the Argentine grape and wine industry. She was born in Oloron-Sainte-Marie, France, more precisely in the district of Sainte-Croix, Oloron, rue Mercière Nº13, (erstwhile called rue Centule). She died in San Martín, Mendoza, Argentina.

Anna Larroucau, daughter of Louis Barthélémy Larroucau and Justine Laborde, was the elder of 16 brothers, all born in Oloron.

Towards 1878 Anna migrated to Argentina, in company of her uncles and some brothers. In Argentina, Anna worked as an educational governess and during a certain time, she also taught music and French. She was fluent in Basque, Gascon, Spanish and French. Friend of the writer Jules Supervielle's family. Anna pursued her studies at the famous Collège Sacré-Cœur of Oloron.

Towards 1880, Anna Larroucau introduced in San Martin, Mendoza, the first plants of grapevine of French origin, which she had brought from Bordeaux, France. In all of Mendoza grapevines of Spanish or Italian origins were slowly replaced by these new ones of French origin, providing an improved performance and an optimization of wine.
On July 27, 1887, in San Martin, Mendoza, she married Leopoldo Lucero Rincons, a famous farm and cousin of the governor of the neighbor Province of San Luis, General Brigadier Pablo Lucero. The couple Lucero Larroucau will give rise to an important lineage in all of Argentina.
Towards 1900 Anna Larroucau, already widow, founded the First Company of Charity of San Martín, Mendoza. During decades she ran the association. Through this institution, she worked for the well-being and the education of childhood in that region of Argentina.

References
Revista de la Junta de Estudios Históricos de Mendoza, 1968, p. 493. (Revue of the Association of Historic Studies of Mendoza, Argentina).
Carlos Alvarado-Larroucau, "Ernesto Nava" in Alba Omil comp., Italianos en Tucumán, Historias de vida, Yerba Buena, Tucumán, Argentina, Lucio Piérola Ediciones, p. 82.
"Une rue pour Anna Larroucau-Laborde de Lucero", Inf'Oloron, Oloron-Ste-Marie, Automne 2016, n.º7, p. 22.

About her family, see also:

Crónica de los Franceses en Rosario, Emilio Maisonnave; Alberto Campazas; Emilio Ricardo Maisonnave; prefacio de Paul Dijoud. Rosario : s.e., 1998.
Alberto SARRAMONE, Los Abuelos bearneses y gascones. Azul, Buenos Aires, Argentina, Editorial Biblos Azul 2001. p. 288.

Other References in Archives

The Genealogical Center of Pyréenées Atlantiques, Pau, France
Archives Bishopric of Mendoza, Argentina
Newspaper The Andes, Mendoza, September 4, 1956, Obituario
Archives Family Lucero (Tucumán, Argentina)
Archives Larroucau Family (Chile)
Archives Family González Dangles (Chile)

External links
See in Spanish, on Carlos Alvarado-Larroucau weblog page:
Anna Larroucau Laborde de Lucero
François Larroucau Laborde

1864 births
1956 deaths
People from Oloron-Sainte-Marie
French emigrants to Argentina
French viticulturists
Argentine philanthropists
Argentine educators
Argentine women educators
French philanthropists
Women philanthropists
French educators
French women educators